Dance of the Yao People (simplified: 瑶族舞曲; traditional: 瑤族舞曲; pinyin: Yáozú Wǔqǔ; sometimes translated as Dance of the Yao Tribe) is one of the best known and most popular Chinese instrumental compositions of the second half of the 20th century. It was composed collaboratively by Liu Tieshan (刘铁山) and Mao Yuan (茅沅) in 1952, inspired by the long drum dance (瑶族长鼓舞歌), a form of traditional festival music of the Yao people of southern and southwest China. It was premiered in Beijing in 1953.

History
Inspired by the folk songs of Yao people, Liu Tieshan composed Long Drum Dance of the Yao People during a visit to Youling village (油岭村),  Sanpai town (三排镇), Liannan Yao Autonomous County (连南瑶族自治县), Qingyuan (清远市), northern Guangdong province, southern China in 1951. Mao Yuan, another composer, adapted this piece into an orchestral work in 1952.

Although it was originally composed for Western instruments, it is generally performed by Chinese traditional instruments (either for solo guzheng,video chamber ensemble, or orchestral).video It is also performed by ensembles or orchestras of Western instruments.video

The work achieved wide attention in 1954, when the arrangement for Chinese orchestra by the conductor Peng Xiuwen was disseminated throughout China. Other arrangements have been made by the Taiwanese composers Cheng Si-sum (鄭思森) and Chen Tscheng-hsiung (陳澄雄).

Musically, the work is in several sections, some slow and some fast. It begins in 2/4 meter at a slow tempo, moves to 3/4 meter, then returns to 2/4 meter in a faster tempo for the finale.

In the late 20th century, the song was used as the basis for several pop songs, in both China and the United States. The first 18 notes of the 1998 song "When You Believe," as recorded by Whitney Houston and Mariah Carey, are based on "Dance of the Yao People," although the Chinese composers of the original work were not credited.

The piece has been performed in the Musikverein hall in Vienna.

In popular culture
 Used in the soundtrack for the Commodore 64 game The Way of the Exploding Fist (1985)
 Partially covered by heavy metal band Cacophony on the song "Black Cat", from the album Go Off! (1988)

External links

Video

Video of "When You Believe"
Dance of the Yao People videos
Dance of the Yao People videos
Dance of the Yao People videos

See also
Dance of the Yi People

References

Chinese classical music
Yao people
1951 compositions
1952 compositions